West 3rd (also known as West 3rd–Stadium and signed as West Third Street FirstEnergy Stadium) is a station on the RTA Waterfront Line in Cleveland, Ohio. The station is located on the east side of West 3rd Street and south of the westboard exit ramp of the Cleveland Memorial Shoreway. The station primarily serves as a destination for those going to Cleveland Browns football games and as an access for those leaving the games.

The station's main entrance is from the north platform on its west side from West 3rd Street. There is a small station lobby with an attendant booth (usually unattended) and an elevator and stairs leading down to the north side platform. There are also ramps on its north side from West 3rd Street and from Lerner Way adjacent to FirstEnergy Stadium. These ramps are usually closed except during Browns games, and there are multiple faregates to handle crowds using the station during the games. Access to the south platform is by crossings that extend across both tracks at each end of the south platform.

History
Foundations for the station were put in place when the Waterfront Line was constructed, but there was no station when the Waterfront Line opened on July 10, 1996, since Cleveland Municipal Stadium was being demolished and construction of FirstEnergy Stadium had not yet begun. The $5 million station was later completed and opened on August 12, 1999,
in time for the first home game.

Station layout

Notable places nearby
 FirstEnergy Stadium (formerly Cleveland Browns Stadium)
 Justice Center
 The Warehouse District
 Port of Cleveland
 Perry Monument
 Cuyahoga County Courthouse
 Justice Center Complex
 Huntington Convention Center of Cleveland
 Cleveland Convention Center (demolished)
 Global Center for Health Innovation
 The Mall

Gallery

References

External links

West 003 Street
Railway stations in the United States opened in 1999
Railway stations closed in 2020
1999 establishments in Ohio